Arandis may refer to:
 Arandis Constituency, Namibia
 Arandis, Namibia, a town
 Ourique Municipality, Portugal, formerly Arandis